Pedro Capó is the second studio album by Puerto Rican singer Pedro Capó, released by Sony Music Latin on September 19, 2011.

Credits and personnel
Credits adapted from AllMusic.

Claudia Brant – Composer
Joseph Brennan – Composer
Pedro Capó – Composer, Coros, Primary Artist
Samuel Rosa De Alvarenga – Composer
Isabel de Jesús – A&R
Rafael Esparza-Ruiz – Composer
Jaime Flores – Composer
Kany García – Composer, Featured Artist
Leonel García – Composer
Gilberto Gil – Composer
Katrina Lenk – Viola
Luigie Gonzalez – Mezcla
Dennis Morehouse – Bateria
Raúl Ornelas – Composer
Eduardo Osorio – Composer
Mark Portman – Composer
José Fernando Gómez Do Reis – Composer
Carlos Salazar – Guitarron, Vihuela
Amanda Zidow – Cello

Track listing

Charts

References

Pedro Capó albums
2011 albums